() is a campaign started in the 21st century by the  to promote and stimulate the use of the Breton language in daily life in Brittany, northwestern France. Breton is a Brythonic Celtic language which has fallen out of general use since the mid-20th century. Efforts are underway in the region to revive the language, which is classified by UNESCO as endangered.

Charter for private sectors 

With the first phase of Ya d'ar brezhoneg, started on 5 October 2001, the office worked to promote the use of the Breton language within civil society.  The office would certify businesses, social services and non-governmental organizations at three levels:

 This label is given to entities that broadly use Breton in their communications.  These organizations support the Breton language since they spread the language through their daily functioning, through their public image as a bilingual organization. However this level does not mean that they are accessible to the public in Breton, or work in Breton. Printed documents may be bilingual (rather than exclusively in Breton) but both languages must be presented equally.
 This label is given to organizations that offer their services in the Breton language.
 This label is given to organizations in which the working language is Breton.

By 2006 the charter had gained signed agreement by 579 businesses, social services and non-governmental organizations to support the use of Breton in their operations.

Charter for local authorities 

In the second phase, started on 22 December 2004, Ya d'ar brezhoneg added a charter for local authorities in Brittany. The office encourages communes to promote the use of Breton, for instance, by installing bilingual (Breton and French) road signs, and creating bilingual promotion posters for local events, in order to promote the use of Breton in daily life.

Levels of the charter 

The charter for local authorities is organized into four levels, each with an increasing number of requirements.  If a municipality meets the objectives it is certified "" at either level 1, 2, 3 or 4 and can move to that level.

References

External links 
 

Breton language
2001 introductions
Language revival
Celtic language advocacy organizations